Thomas Declan Mulholland (6 December 1932 – 29 June 1999) was a Northern Irish character actor of film and television. He is known for his multiple appearances in Doctor Who and for his deleted portrayal of Jabba the Hutt in Star Wars.

Career 

Born in Belfast, he had his first film role in H.M.S. Defiant (1962) as Morrison.  He had a substantial part in the 1974 Amicus Productions film The Land That Time Forgot.  He also played a human version of Jabba the Hutt in a deleted scene of the original Star Wars (1977). The scene was reinserted for the film's twentieth anniversary re-release in 1997, with Mulholland replaced by a CGI Jabba as he appears in Return of the Jedi.

His many TV appearances included the The Avengers (1967) episode The Fear Merchants (in the background of the gym scene), Doctor Who stories The Sea Devils (1972) and The Androids of Tara (1978), The Bill, The Onedin Line and Quatermass.

Mulholland died of a heart attack on 29 June 1999, aged 66.

Filmography

Film

Television

External links

References 

1932 births
1999 deaths
Male film actors from Northern Ireland
Male television actors from Northern Ireland
Male actors from Belfast
20th-century male actors from Northern Ireland